Mohannad Obaid Al-Zaabi (born 25 October 1992), commonly known as Mohannad Al-Zaabi, is an Omani footballer who plays as a goalkeeper for Al-Khaburah SC.

International career
Mohannad is part of the first team squad of the Oman national football team. He was selected for the national team for the first time in 2013. He earned his first international call-up for Oman on 18 June 2013 against Jordan in a crucial 2014 FIFA World Cup qualification match when he was the substitute goalkeeper.

References

External links
 
 
 Mahnad Al-Zaabi at Goal.com 
 

1992 births
Living people
Omani footballers
Oman international footballers
Association football goalkeepers
Al-Khabourah SC players
Fanja SC players
Footballers at the 2010 Asian Games
Asian Games competitors for Oman
People from Al Batinah North Governorate